In computer science and mathematical logic, a proof assistant or interactive theorem prover is a software tool to assist with the development of formal proofs by human-machine collaboration. This involves some sort of interactive proof editor, or other interface, with which a human can guide the search for proofs, the details of which are stored in, and some steps provided by, a computer.

System comparison 

 ACL2 – a programming language, a first-order logical theory, and a theorem prover (with both interactive and automatic modes) in the Boyer–Moore tradition.
 Coq – Allows the expression of mathematical assertions, mechanically checks proofs of these assertions, helps to find formal proofs, and extracts a certified program from the constructive proof of its formal specification.
 HOL theorem provers – A family of tools ultimately derived from the LCF theorem prover.  In these systems the logical core is a library of their programming language.  Theorems represent new elements of the language and can only be introduced via "strategies" which guarantee logical correctness.  Strategy composition gives users the ability to produce significant proofs with relatively few interactions with the system.  Members of the family include:
HOL4 – The "primary descendant", still under active development.  Support for both Moscow ML and Poly/ML. Has a BSD-style license.
HOL Light – A thriving "minimalist fork". OCaml based.
ProofPower – Went proprietary, then returned to open source. Based on Standard ML.
 IMPS, An Interactive Mathematical Proof System
 Isabelle is an interactive theorem prover, successor of HOL.  The main code-base is BSD-licensed, but the Isabelle distribution bundles many add-on tools with different licenses.
 Jape – Java based.
 Lean
 LEGO
 Matita – A light system based on the Calculus of Inductive Constructions.
 MINLOG – A proof assistant based on first-order minimal logic.
 Mizar – A proof assistant based on first-order logic, in a natural deduction style, and Tarski–Grothendieck set theory.
 PhoX – A proof assistant based on higher-order logic which is eXtensible.
 Prototype Verification System (PVS) – a proof language and system based on higher-order logic.
 TPS and ETPS – Interactive theorem provers also based on simply-typed lambda calculus, but based on an independent formulation of the logical theory and independent implementation.

User interfaces 
A popular front-end for proof assistants is the Emacs-based Proof General, developed at the University of Edinburgh.

Coq includes CoqIDE, which is based on OCaml/Gtk.  Isabelle includes Isabelle/jEdit, which is based on jEdit and the Isabelle/Scala infrastructure for document-oriented proof processing. More recently, a Visual Studio Code extension for Isabelle has also been developed by Makarius Wenzel.

See also

Notes

References

External links 

 Theorem Prover Museum
 "Introduction" in Certified Programming with Dependent Types.
 Introduction to the Coq Proof Assistant (with a general introduction to interactive theorem proving)
 Interactive Theorem Proving for Agda Users
 A list of theorem proving tools

 Catalogues
 Digital Math by Category: Tactic Provers
 Automated Deduction Systems and Groups
 Theorem Proving and Automated Reasoning Systems
 Database of Existing Mechanized Reasoning Systems
 NuPRL: Other Systems
 Specific Logical Frameworks and Implementations
 DMOZ: Science: Math: Logic and Foundations: Computational Logic: Logical Frameworks

Argument technology
Automated theorem proving
 

de:Maschinengestütztes Beweisen